

Events

Pre-1600
 934 – Meng Zhixiang declares himself emperor and establishes Later Shu as a new state independent of Later Tang.
1190 – Massacre of Jews at Clifford's Tower, York.
1244 – Over 200 Cathars who refuse to recant are burnt to death after the Fall of Montségur.

1601–1900
1621 – Samoset, a Mohegan, visits the settlers of Plymouth Colony and greets them, "Welcome, Englishmen! My name is Samoset."
1660 – The Long Parliament of England is dissolved so as to prepare for the new Convention Parliament.
1792 – King Gustav III of Sweden is shot; he dies on March 29.
1802 – The Army Corps of Engineers is established to found and operate the United States Military Academy at West Point.
1815 – Prince Willem proclaims himself King of the United Kingdom of the Netherlands, the first constitutional monarch in the Netherlands.
1872 – The Wanderers F.C. win the first FA Cup, the oldest football competition in the world, beating Royal Engineers A.F.C. 1–0 at The Oval in Kennington, London.
1898 – In Melbourne, the representatives of five colonies adopt a constitution, which would become the basis of the Commonwealth of Australia.

1901–present
1916 – The 7th and 10th US cavalry regiments under John J. Pershing cross the US–Mexico border to join the hunt for Pancho Villa.
1918 – Finnish Civil War: Battle of Länkipohja is infamous for its bloody aftermath as the Whites execute 70–100 capitulated Reds.
1924 – In accordance with the Treaty of Rome, Fiume becomes annexed as part of Italy.
1926 – History of Rocketry: Robert Goddard launches the first liquid-fueled rocket, at Auburn, Massachusetts.
1935 – Adolf Hitler orders Germany to rearm herself in violation of the Treaty of Versailles. Conscription is reintroduced to form the Wehrmacht.
1936 – Warmer-than-normal temperatures rapidly melt snow and ice on the upper Allegheny and Monongahela rivers, leading to a major flood in Pittsburgh.
1939 – From Prague Castle, Hitler proclaims Bohemia and Moravia a German protectorate.
1941 – Operation Appearance takes place to re-establish British Somaliland
1945 – World War II: The Battle of Iwo Jima ends, but small pockets of Japanese resistance persist.
  1945   – Ninety percent of Würzburg, Germany is destroyed in only 20 minutes by British bombers, resulting in at least 4,000 deaths. 
1962 – Flying Tiger Line Flight 739 disappears in the western Pacific Ocean with all 107 aboard missing and presumed dead.
1966 – Launch of Gemini 8 with astronauts Neil Armstrong and David Scott. It would perform the first docking of two spacecraft in orbit.
1968 – Vietnam War: My Lai Massacre occurs; between 347 and 500 Vietnamese villagers are killed by American troops.
1969 – A Viasa McDonnell Douglas DC-9 crashes in Maracaibo, Venezuela, killing 155.
1977 – Assassination of Kamal Jumblatt, the main leader of the anti-government forces in the Lebanese Civil War.
1978 – Former Italian Prime Minister Aldo Moro is kidnapped; he is later murdered by his captors.
  1978   – A Balkan Bulgarian Airlines Tupolev Tu-134 crashes near Gabare, Bulgaria, killing 73.
  1978   – Supertanker Amoco Cadiz splits in two after running aground on the Portsall Rocks, three miles off the coast of Brittany, resulting in the largest oil spill in history at that time.
1979 – Sino-Vietnamese War: The People's Liberation Army crosses the border back into China, ending the war.
1984 – William Buckley, the CIA station chief in Lebanon, is kidnapped by Hezbollah; he later dies in captivity.
1985 – Associated Press newsman Terry Anderson is taken hostage in Beirut; he is not released until December 1991.
1988 – Iran–Contra affair: Lieutenant Colonel Oliver North and Vice Admiral John Poindexter are indicted on charges of conspiracy to defraud the United States.
  1988   – Halabja chemical attack: The Kurdish town of Halabja in Iraq is attacked with a mix of poison gas and nerve agents on the orders of Saddam Hussein, killing 5,000 people and injuring about 10,000 people.
  1988   – The Troubles: Ulster loyalist militant Michael Stone attacks a Provisional IRA funeral in Belfast with pistols and grenades. Three persons, one of them a member of PIRA are killed, and more than 60 others are wounded.
1995 – Mississippi formally ratifies the Thirteenth Amendment to the United States Constitution, becoming the last state to approve the abolition of slavery. The Thirteenth Amendment was officially ratified in 1865.
2001 – A series of bomb blasts in the city of Shijiazhuang, China kill 108 people and injure 38 others, the biggest mass murder in China in decades.
2003 – American activist Rachel Corrie is killed in Rafah by being run over by an Israel Defense Forces bulldozer while trying to obstruct the demolition of a home.
2005 – Israel officially hands over Jericho to Palestinian control.
2014 – Crimea votes in a controversial referendum to secede from Ukraine to join Russia.
2016 – A bomb detonates in a bus carrying government employees in Peshawar, Pakistan, killing 15 and injuring at least 30.
  2016   – Two suicide bombers detonate their explosives at a mosque during morning prayer on the outskirts of Maiduguri, Nigeria, killing 24 and injuring 18.
2020 – The Dow Jones Industrial Average falls by 2,997.10, the single largest point drop in history and the second-largest percentage drop ever at 12.93%, an even greater crash than Black Monday (1929). This follows the U.S. Federal Reserve announcing that it will cut its target interest rate to 0–0.25%.
2021 – Atlanta spa shootings: Eight people are killed and one is injured in a trio of shootings at spas in and near Atlanta, Georgia, U.S. A suspect is arrested the same day.
2022 – A  7.4-magnitude earthquake occurs off the coast of Fukushima, Japan, killing 4 people and injuring 225.

Births

Pre-1600
1399 – The Xuande Emperor, ruler of Ming China (d. 1435)
1445 – Johann Geiler von Kaysersberg, Swiss priest and theologian (d. 1510)
1465 – Kunigunde of Austria, Duchess of Bavaria (d. 1520)
1473 – Henry IV, Duke of Saxony (d. 1541)
1559 – Amar Singh I, successor of Maharana Pratap of Mewar (d. 1620)
1581 – Pieter Corneliszoon Hooft, Dutch historian and poet (d. 1647)
1585 – Gerbrand Bredero, Dutch poet and playwright (d. 1618)
1590 – Ii Naotaka, Japanese daimyō (d. 1659)
1596 – Ebba Brahe, Swedish countess (d. 1674)

1601–1900
1609 – Michael Franck, German poet and composer of hymns (d. 1667)
  1609   – Agostino Mitelli, Italian painter (d. 1660)
1621 – Georg Neumark, German poet and composer of hymns (d. 1681)
1631 – René Le Bossu, French literary critic (d. 1680)
1638 – François Crépieul, Jesuit missionary (d. 1702)
1654 – Andreas Acoluthus, German scholar (d. 1704)
1670 – François de Franquetot de Coigny, French general (d. 1759)
1673 – Jean Bouhier, French jurist and scholar (d. 1746)
1687 – Sophia Dorothea of Hanover, queen consort of Frederick William I (d. 1757)
1693 – Malhar Rao Holkar, Indian nobleman (d. 1766)
1701 – Daniel Lorenz Salthenius, Swedish theologian (d. 1750)
1729 – Maria Louise Albertine (d. 1818)
1741 – Carlo Amoretti, Italian scientist (d. 1816)
1744 – Nicolas-Germain Léonard, Guadeloupean poet and novelist (d. 1793)
1750 – Caroline Herschel, German-English astronomer (d. 1848)
1751 – James Madison, American academic and politician, 4th President of the United States (d. 1836)
1753 – François Amédée Doppet, French general (d. 1799)
1760 – Johann Heinrich Meyer, Swiss painter and writer (d. 1832)
1766 – Jean-Frédéric Waldeck,  French antiquarian, cartographer, artist and explorer (d. 1875)
1771 – Antoine-Jean Gros, French painter (d. 1835)
1773 – Juan Ramón Balcarce, Argentinian general and politician, 6th Governor of Buenos Aires Province (d. 1836)
1774 – Matthew Flinders, English navigator and cartographer (d. 1814)
1789 – Francis Rawdon Chesney, English general and explorer (d. 1872)
  1789   – Georg Ohm, German physicist and mathematician (d. 1854)
1794 – Ami Boué, Austrian geologist and ethnographer (d. 1881)
1797 – Alaric Alexander Watts, English poet and journalist (d. 1864)
1799 – Anna Atkins, English botanist and photographer (d. 1871)
1800 – Emperor Ninkō of Japan (d. 1846)
1805 – Ernst von Lasaulx, German philologist and politician (d. 1861)
1806 – Félix De Vigne, Belgian painter (d. 1862)
1808 – Hannah T. King, British-born American writer and pioneer (d. 1886)
1813 – Gaëtan de Rochebouët, French prime minister (d. 1899)
1819 – José Paranhos, Brazilian politician (d. 1880)
1820 – Enrico Tamberlik, Italian tenor (d. 1889)
1821 – Eduard Heine, German mathematician and academic (d. 1881)
1822 – Rosa Bonheur, French painter and sculptor (d. 1899)
  1822   – John Pope, American general (d. 1892)
1823 – William Henry Monk, English organist and composer  (d. 1889)
1825 – Camilo Castelo Branco, Portuguese writer (d. 1890)
1828 – Émile Deshayes de Marcère, French politician (d. 1918)
1834 – James Hector, Scottish geologist and surgeon (d. 1907)
1836 – Andrew Smith Hallidie, English-American engineer and inventor (d. 1900)
1839 – Sully Prudhomme, French poet and critic, Nobel Prize laureate (d. 1907)
  1839   – John Butler Yeats, Irish painter (d. 1922)
1840 – Shibusawa Eiichi, Japanese industrialist (d. 1931)
  1840   – Georg von der Gabelentz, German linguist and sinologist (d. 1893)
1845 – Umegatani Tōtarō I, Japanese sumo wrestler, the 15th Yokozuna (d. 1928)
1846 – Gösta Mittag-Leffler, Swedish mathematician and academic (d. 1927)
  1846   – Rebecca Cole, American physician and social reformer (d. 1922) 
  1846   – Jurgis Bielinis, Lithuanian book smuggler (d. 1918)
1848 – Axel Heiberg, Norwegian financier and diplomat (d. 1932)
1851 – Otto Bardenhewer, German theologian (d. 1935)
  1851   – Martinus Beijerinck, Dutch microbiologist and botanist (d. 1931)
1856 – Napoléon, Prince Imperial of France (d. 1879)
1857 – Charles Harding Firth, English historian (d. 1936)
1859 – Alexander Stepanovich Popov, Russian physicist and inventor (d. 1906)
1865 – Patsy Donovan, Irish-American baseball player and manager (d. 1953)
1869 – Willy Burmester, German violinist (d. 1933)
1871 – Hans Merensky, South African geologist and philanthropist (d. 1951)
  1871   – Frantz Reichel, French rugby player and hurdler (d. 1932)
1874 – Frédéric François-Marsal, French prime minister (d. 1958)
1877 – Léo-Ernest Ouimet, Canadian director and producer (d. 1972)
1878 – Clemens August Graf von Galen, German cardinal (d. 1946)
  1878   – Paul Jouve, French painter (d. 1973)
1881 – Fannie Charles Dillon, American composer (d. 1947)
1882 – James Lightbody, American runner (d. 1953)
1883 – Ethel Anderson, Australian poet, author, and painter (d. 1958)
1884 – Eric P. Kelly, American journalist and author (d. 1960)
1885 – Giacomo Benvenuti, Italian composer and musicologist (d. 1943)
  1885   – Sydney Chaplin, English actor (d. 1965)
1886 – Herbert Lindström, Swedish tug of war player (d. 1951)
1887 – Emilio Lunghi, Italian runner (d. 1925)
  1887   – S. Stillman Berry, American marine zoologist (1984)
1889 – Reggie Walker, South African athlete (d. 1951)
1892 – César Vallejo, Peruvian poet (d. 1938)
1895 – Ernest Labrousse, French historian (d. 1988)
1897 – Antonio Donghi, Italian painter (d. 1963)
  1897   – Conrad Nagel, American actor (d. 1970)
1900 – Cyril Hume, American novelist and screenwriter (d. 1966)
  1900   – Mencha Karnicheva, Macedonian revolutionary and assassin (d. 1964)

1901–present
1901 – Alexis Chantraine, Belgian footballer (d. 1987)
1903 – Mike Mansfield, American politician and diplomat, 22nd United States Ambassador to Japan (d. 2001)
1906 – Francisco Ayala, Spanish sociologist, author, and translator (d. 2009)
  1906   – Maurice Turnbull, Welsh-English cricketer and rugby player (d. 1944)
  1906   – Henny Youngman, English-American violinist and comedian (d. 1998)
1908 – René Daumal, French author and poet (d. 1944)
  1908   – Ernest Rogez, French water polo player (d. 1986)
  1908   – Robert Rossen, American director, producer, and screenwriter (d. 1966)
1909 – Don Raye, American songwriter (d. 1985)
1910 – Aladár Gerevich, Hungarian fencer (d. 1991)
  1910   – Iftikhar Ali Khan Pataudi, Indian-English cricketer and politician, 8th Nawab of Pataudi (d. 1952)
1911 – Pierre Harmel, former Prime Minister, later foreign minister of Belgium (d. 2009)
  1911   – Josef Mengele, German physician, captain and mass-murderer (d. 1979)
  1911   – Philip Pavia, American painter and sculptor (d. 2005)
1912 – Pat Nixon, First Lady of the United States (d. 1993)
1913 – Rémy Raffalli, French soldier (d. 1952)
1915 – Kunihiko Kodaira, Japanese mathematician (d. 1997)
1916 – Mercedes McCambridge, American actress (d. 2004)
  1916   – Tsutomu Yamaguchi, Japanese engineer and businessman (d. 2010)
1917 – Louis C. Wyman, American lawyer and politician (d. 2002)
  1917   – Laure Pillay,  Mauritian lawyer and jurist (d. 2017) 
  1917   – Mehrdad Pahlbod, Iranian politician (d. 2018)
1918 – Aldo van Eyck, Dutch architect (d. 1999)
  1918   – Frederick Reines, American physicist and academic, Nobel Prize laureate (d. 1998)
1920 – John Addison, English-American soldier and composer (d. 1998)
  1920   – Sid Fleischman, American author and screenwriter (d. 2010)
  1920   – Traudl Junge, German secretary (d. 2002)
  1920   – Leo McKern, Australian-English actor (d. 2002)
1922 – Harding Lemay, American screenwriter and playwright (d. 2018)
1923 – Heinz Wallberg, German conductor (d. 2004)
1925 – Cornell Borchers, Lithuanian-German actress and singer (d. 2014)
  1925   – Mary Hinkson, American dancer and choreographer (d. 2014)
  1925   – Ervin Kassai, Hungarian basketball player and referee (d. 2012)
  1925   – Luis E. Miramontes, Mexican chemist and engineer (d. 2004)
1926 – Charles Goodell, American lawyer and politician (d. 1987)
  1926   – Jerry Lewis, American actor and comedian (d. 2017)
1927 – Vladimir Komarov, Russian pilot, engineer, and cosmonaut (d. 1967)
  1927   – Daniel Patrick Moynihan, American sociologist and politician, 12th United States Ambassador to the United Nations (d. 2003)
  1927   – Olga San Juan, American actress and dancer (d. 2009)
1928 – Wakanohana Kanji I, Japanese sumo wrestler, the 45th Yokozuna (d. 2010)
  1928   – Christa Ludwig, German opera singer (d. 2021)
1929 – Betty Johnson, American singer (d. 2022)
  1929   – Tihomir Novakov, Serbian-American physicist and academic (d. 2015)
  1929   – Nadja Tiller, Austrian actress (d. 2023)
1930 – Tommy Flanagan, American pianist and composer (d. 2001)
  1930   – Minoru Miki, Japanese composer (d. 2011)
1931 – Augusto Boal, Brazilian theatre director, writer and politician (d. 2009)
  1931   – Alan Heyman, American-South Korean musicologist and composer (d. 2014)
  1931   – Anthony Kenny, English philosopher and academic
  1931   – John Munro, Canadian lawyer and politician, 22nd Canadian Minister of Labour (d. 2003)
1932 – Don Blasingame, American baseball player and manager (d. 2005)
  1932   – Walter Cunningham, American astronaut (d. 2023)
  1932   – Kurt Diemberger, Austrian mountaineer and author
  1932   – Herbert Marx, Canadian politician (d. 2020)
1933 – Keith Critchlow, English architect and academic, co-founded Temenos Academy (d. 2020)
  1933   – Sanford I. Weill, American banker, financier, and philanthropist
1934 – Jean Cournoyer, Canadian politician
  1934   – Ray Hnatyshyn, Canadian lawyer and politician, 24th Governor General of Canada (d. 2002)
  1934   – Roger Norrington, English violinist and conductor
1935 – Teresa Berganza, Spanish soprano and actress (d. 2022)
  1935   – Pepe Cáceres, Colombian bullfighter (d. 1987)
1936 – Raymond Vahan Damadian, Armenian-American inventor, invented the MRI (d. 2022)
  1936   – Fred Neil, American folk singer-songwriter and guitarist (d. 2001)
1937 – David Frith, English historian, journalist, and author
  1937   – Attilio Nicora, Italian cardinal (d. 2017)
  1937   – Amos Tversky, Israeli-American psychologist and academic (d. 1996)
1938 – Carlos Bilardo, Argentinian footballer and manager
1939 – Yvon Côté, Canadian politician and teacher
1940 – Vagif Mustafazadeh, Azerbaijani pianist and composer (d. 1979)
  1940   – Jan Pronk, Dutch academic and politician, Dutch Ministry of Housing, Spatial Planning and the Environment
  1940   – Keith Rowe, English guitarist 
1941 – Bernardo Bertolucci, Italian director and screenwriter (d. 2018)
  1941   – Robert Guéï, Ivorian soldier and politician, 3rd President of Côte d'Ivoire (d. 2002)
  1941   – Chuck Woolery, American game show host and television personality
1942 – Roger Crozier, Canadian-American ice hockey player (d. 1996)
  1942   – Gijs van Lennep, Dutch race car driver
  1942   – Jean-Pierre Schosteck, French politician
  1942   – James Soong, Chinese-Taiwanese politician, Governor of Taiwan Province
  1942   – Jerry Jeff Walker, American singer-songwriter and guitarist (d. 2020)
1943 – Ursula Goodenough, American biologist, zoologist, and author
  1943   – Hans Heyer, German race car driver
  1943   – Álvaro de Soto, Peruvian diplomat
1944 – Andrew S. Tanenbaum, American computer scientist and academic
1946 – Sigmund Groven, Norwegian harmonica player and composer
  1946   – Mary Kaldor, English economist and academic
  1946   – J. Z. Knight, American New Age teacher and author
  1946   – Guesch Patti, French singer
1948 – Michael Owen Bruce, American singer-songwriter and guitarist 
  1948   – Richard Desjardins, Canadian singer-songwriter and director
  1948   – Catherine Quéré, French politician
1949 – Erik Estrada, American actor 
  1949   – Victor Garber, Canadian actor and singer
  1949   – Elliott Murphy, American-French singer-songwriter and journalist
1950 – Peter Forster, English bishop
  1950   – Kate Nelligan, Canadian actress
  1950   – Edhem Šljivo, Bosnian footballer 
1951 – Ray Benson, American singer-songwriter, guitarist, and producer 
  1951   – Abdelmajid Bourebbou,  Algerian footballer
  1951   – Oddvar Brå, Norwegian skier
  1951   – Joe DeLamielleure, American football player
  1951   – Alexandre Gonzalez, French long-distance runner
1953 – Claus Peter Flor, German conductor
  1953   – Isabelle Huppert, French actress
  1953   – Rainer Knaak, German chess player
  1953   – Richard Stallman, American computer scientist and programmer
1954 – David Heath, English politician
  1954   – Colin Ireland, English serial killer (d. 2012)
  1954   – Jimmy Nail, English singer-songwriter, guitarist, and actor
  1954   – Tim O'Brien, American singer-songwriter and guitarist 
  1954   – Dav Whatmore, Sri Lankan-Australian cricketer and coach
  1954   – Nancy Wilson, American singer-songwriter, guitarist, producer, and actress 
1955 – Svetlana Alexeeva, Russian ice dancer and coach
  1955   – Rimantas Astrauskas, Lithuanian physicist
  1955   – Bruno Barreto, Brazilian director, producer, and screenwriter
  1955   – Linda Lepomme, Belgian actress and singer
  1955   – Bob Ley, American sports anchor and reporter
  1955   – Andy Scott, Canadian politician (d. 2013)
  1955   – Jiro Watanabe, Japanese boxer
1956 – Ozzie Newsome, American football player and manager
  1956   – Clifton Powell, American actor, director, and producer
  1956   – Yoriko Shono, Japanese writer
  1956   – Eveline Widmer-Schlumpf, Swiss lawyer and politician
1958 – Phillip Wilcher, Australian pianist and composer
  1958   – Kate Worley, American author (d. 2004)
  1958   – Jorge Ramos, Mexican-American journalist and author
1959 – Michael J. Bloomfield, American astronaut
  1959   – Sebastian Currier, American composer and educator
  1959   – Greg Dyer, Australian cricketer
  1959   – Flavor Flav, American rapper and actor
  1959   – Charles Hudson, American baseball player 
  1959   – Steve Marker, American musician
  1959   – Jens Stoltenberg, Norwegian economist and politician, 27th Prime Minister of Norway, 13th Secretary General of NATO
1960 – John Hemming, English businessman and politician
  1960   – Duane Sutter, Canadian ice hockey player and coach
  1960   – Jenny Eclair, English comedian, actress and screenwriter
1961 – Brett Kenny, Australian rugby league player and coach
  1961   – Todd McFarlane, Canadian author, illustrator, and businessman, founded McFarlane Toys
1962 – Franck Fréon, French race car driver
  1962   – Liliane Gaschet, French athlete 
1963 – Jerome Flynn, English actor and singer
  1963   – Kevin Smith, New Zealand actor and singer (d. 2002)
1964 – Patty Griffin, American singer-songwriter 
  1964   – Jaclyn Jose, Filipino actress
  1964   – Pascal Richard, Swiss racing cyclist
  1964   – Gore Verbinski, American director, producer, and screenwriter
1965 – Steve Armstrong, American wrestler
  1965   – Cindy Brown, American basketball player
  1965   – Mark Carney, Canadian-English economist and banker
  1965   – Cristiana Reali, Italian-Brazilian actress
1966 – H.P. Baxxter, German musician
  1966   – Chrissy Redden, Canadian cross-country cyclist
1967 – Tracy Bonham, American singer and violinist
  1967   – John Darnielle, American musician and novelist
  1967   – Lauren Graham, American actress and producer
  1967   – Ronnie McCoury, American bluegrass mandolin player, singer and songwriter
  1967   – Heidi Zurbriggen, Swiss alpine skier
1968 – Trevor Wilson, American basketball player and police officer
1969 – Judah Friedlander, American comedian and actor
  1969   – Ottis Gibson, Barbadian cricketer and coach
  1969   – Alina Ivanova, Russian athlete
  1969   – Evangelos Koronios, Greek basketball player and coach
1970 – Joakim Berg, Swedish singer-songwriter and guitarist 
1971 – Franck Comba, French rugby player
  1971   – Alan Tudyk, American actor
1972 – Ismaïl Sghyr, French-Moroccan long-distance runner
1973 – Andrey Mizurov, Kazakhstani road bicycle racer
  1973   – Vonda Ward, American boxer
1974 – Georgios Anatolakis, Greek footballer and politician
  1974   – Anne Charrier, French actress
  1974   – Heath Streak, Zimbabwean cricketer
1975 – Luciano Castro, Argentine actor 
  1975   – Sienna Guillory, English model and actress
  1975   – Lionel Torres, French archer
1976 – Blu Cantrell, American singer-songwriter and producer
  1976   – Leila Lejeune, French handballer 
  1976   – Susanne Ljungskog, Swedish cyclist
  1976   – Abraham Núñez, Dominican baseball player
  1976   – Zhu Chen, Qatari chess Grandmaster
1977 – Mónica Cruz, Spanish actress and dancer
  1977   – Thomas Rupprath, German swimmer
1978 – Brooke Burns, American fashion model, television personality, and actress
  1978   – Annett Renneberg, German actress and singer
1979 – Christina Liebherr, Swiss equestrian
  1979   – Rashad Moore, American football player
  1979   – Sébastien Ostertag, French handball player
  1979   – Leena Peisa, Finnish keyboard player and songwriter 
  1979   – Andrei Stepanov, Estonian footballer
1980 – Todd Heap, American football player
  1980   – Felipe Reyes, Spanish basketball player
1981 – Andrew Bree, Irish swimmer
  1981   – Danny Brown, American rapper
  1981   – Curtis Granderson, American baseball player
  1981   – Julien Mazet, French road bicycle racer
  1981   – Fabiana Murer, Brazilian pole vaulter
1982 – Miguel Comminges, Guadeloupean footballer 
  1982   – Riley Cote, Canadian ice hockey player and coach
  1982   – Jesús Del Nero, Spanish road bicycle racer 
  1982   – Brian Wilson, American baseball player
1983 – Stephen Drew, American baseball player
  1983   – Brandon League, American baseball player
  1983   – Nicolas Rousseau, French road bicycle racer 
  1983   – Tramon Williams, American football player
1984 – Levi Brown, American football player
  1984   – Aisling Bea, Irish comedienne and actress
  1984   – Sharon Cherop, Kenyan long-distance runner
  1984   – Michael Ennis, Australian rugby player
  1984   – Hosea Gear, New Zealand rugby player
  1984   – Brandon Prust, Canadian ice hockey player
1985 – Teddy Atine-Venel, French athlete 
  1985   – Eddy Lover, Panamanian singer-songwriter
  1985   – Aleksei Sokirskiy, Russian hammer thrower
1986 – Alexandra Daddario, American actress
  1986   – Toney Douglas, American basketball player
  1986   – Kenny Dykstra, American wrestler
  1986   – T. J. Jordan, American basketball player
  1986   – Boaz Solossa, Indonesian footballer
  1986   – Daisuke Takahashi, Japanese figure skater
1987 – Fabien Lemoine, French football player
1988 – Jessica Gregg, Canadian speed skater
  1988   – Patrick Herrmann, German footballer
1989 – Blake Griffin, American basketball player
  1989   – Jung So-min, South Korean actress
  1989   – Magalie Pottier, French racing cyclist
  1989   – Theo Walcott, English footballer
1990 – Andre Young, American basketball player
1991 – Reggie Bullock, American basketball player
  1991   – Wolfgang Van Halen, American bassist
1993 – George Ford, English rugby union player
  1993   – Marine Lorphelin, Miss France
1994 – Joel Embiid, Cameroonian basketball player
1995 – Inga Janulevičiūtė, Lithuanian figure skater
1997 – Florian Neuhaus, German football player
1999 – Vladimir Guerrero Jr., Canadian baseball player

Deaths

Pre-1600
AD 37 – Tiberius, Roman emperor (b. 42 BC)
 455 – Valentinian III, Roman emperor (assassinated;  b. 419)
   455   – Heraclius, Roman courtier (primicerius sacri cubiculi )
 842 – Xiao Mian, chancellor of the Tang Dynasty
 933 – Takin al-Khazari, Egyptian commander and politician, Abbasid Governor of Egypt
 943 – Pi Guangye, Chinese official and chancellor (b. 877)
1021 – Heribert of Cologne, German archbishop and saint (b. 970)
1072 – Adalbert of Hamburg, German archbishop (b. 1000)
1181 – Henry I, Count of Champagne
1185 – Baldwin IV of Jerusalem (b. 1161)
1279 – Jeanne of Dammartin, Queen consort of Castile and León (b. 1216)
1322 – Humphrey de Bohun, 4th Earl of Hereford, English general and politician, Lord High Constable of England (b. 1276)
1405 – Margaret III, Countess of Flanders (b. 1350)
1410 – John Beaufort, 1st Earl of Somerset, French-English admiral and politician, Lord Warden of the Cinque Ports (b. 1373)
1457 – Ladislaus Hunyadi, Hungarian politician (b. 1433)
1485 – Anne Neville, queen of Richard III of England (b. 1456)
1559 – Anthony St. Leger, English-Irish politician Lord Deputy of Ireland (b. 1496)

1601–1900
1649 – Jean de Brébeuf, French-Canadian missionary and saint (b. 1593)
1679 – John Leverett, English general and politician, 19th Governor of the Massachusetts Bay Colony (b. 1616)
1698 – Leonora Christina Ulfeldt, Danish countess, author of Jammers Minde (b. 1621)
1721 – James Craggs the Elder, English politician, Postmaster General of the United Kingdom (b. 1657)
1736 – Giovanni Battista Pergolesi, Italian composer (b. 1710)
1737 – Benjamin Wadsworth, American minister and academic (b. 1670)
1738 – George Bähr, German architect, designed the Dresden Frauenkirche (b. 1666)
1747 – Christian August, Prince of Anhalt-Zerbst (b. 1690)
1838 – Nathaniel Bowditch, American ocean navigator and mathematician (b. 1773)
1841 – Félix Savart, French physicist and psychologist (b. 1791)
1868 – David Wilmot, American politician, sponsor of Wilmot Proviso (b. 1814)
1884 – Art Croft, American baseball player (b. 1855)
1888 – Hippolyte Carnot, French politician (b. 1801)
1892 – Samuel F. Miller, American politician (b. 1827)
1898 – Aubrey Beardsley, English author and illustrator (b. 1872)
1899 – Joseph Medill, American journalist and politician, 26th Mayor of Chicago (b. 1823)

1901–present
1903 – Roy Bean, American justice of the peace (b. 1825)
1907 – John O'Leary, Irish republican and journalist (b. 1830)
1912 – Max Burckhard, Austrian theater director (b. 1854)
1914 – Gaston Calmette, French journalist (b. 1858)
  1914   – Charles Albert Gobat, Swiss lawyer and politician, Nobel Prize laureate (b. 1843)
  1914   – John Murray, Scottish oceanographer, biologist, and limnologist (b. 1841)
1925 – August von Wassermann, German bacteriologist and hygienist (b. 1866)
1930 – Miguel Primo de Rivera, Spanish general and politician, Prime Minister of Spain (b. 1870)
1935 – John James Rickard Macleod, Scottish physician and physiologist, Nobel Prize laureate (b. 1876)
  1935   – Aron Nimzowitsch, Latvian-Danish chess player (b. 1886)
1936 – Marguerite Durand, French actress, journalist, and activist (b. 1864)
1937 – Austen Chamberlain, English politician, Secretary of State for Foreign and Commonwealth Affairs, Nobel Prize laureate (b. 1863)
  1937   – Alexander von Staël-Holstein, Estonian orientalist and sinologist (b. 1877)
1940 – Selma Lagerlöf, Swedish author and academic, Nobel Prize laureate (b. 1858)
1945 – Börries von Münchhausen, German poet (b. 1874)
1955 – Nicolas de Staël, French-Russian painter and illustrator (b. 1914)
1957 – Constantin Brâncuși, Romanian-French sculptor, painter, and photographer (b. 1876)
1958 – Leon Cadore, American baseball player (b. 1891)
1961 – Chen Geng, Chinese general and politician (b. 1903)
  1961   – Václav Talich, Czech violinist and conductor (b. 1883)
1963 – Laura Adams Armer, American author and photographer (b. 1874)
1965 – Alice Herz, German activist (b. 1882)
1967 – Thomas MacGreevy, Irish poet (b. 1893)
1968 – Mario Castelnuovo-Tedesco, Italian-American pianist and composer (b. 1895)
  1968   – Gunnar Ekelöf, Swedish poet and translator (b. 1907)
  1970   – Tammi Terrell, American singer (b. 1945)
1971 – Bebe Daniels, American actress (b. 1901)
  1971   – Thomas E. Dewey, American lawyer and politician, 47th Governor of New York (b. 1902)
1972 – Pie Traynor, American baseball player (b. 1898)
1975 – T-Bone Walker, American singer-songwriter and guitarist (b. 1910)
1977 – Kamal Jumblatt, Lebanese lawyer and politician (b. 1917)
1979 – Jean Monnet, French economist and politician (b. 1888)
1980 – Tamara de Lempicka, Polish-American painter (b. 1898)
1983 – Arthur Godfrey, American actor and television host (b. 1903)
  1983   – Fred Rose, Polish-Canadian politician (b. 1907)
1985 – Roger Sessions, American composer, critic, and educator (b. 1896)
  1985   – Eddie Shore, Canadian-American ice hockey player (b. 1902)
1988 – Jigger Statz, American baseball player (b.1897)
  1988   – Mickey Thompson, American race car driver (b. 1928)
1990 – Ernst Bacon, American pianist, composer, and conductor (b. 1898)
1991 – Chris Austin, American country singer (b .1964)
  1991   – Jean Bellette, Australian artist (b. 1908)
1992 – Yves Rocard, French physicist and engineer (b. 1903)
1994 – Eric Show, American baseball player (b. 1956)
1998 – Derek Barton, English-American chemist and academic, Nobel Prize laureate (b. 1918)
  1998   – Esther Bubley, American photographer (b. 1921)
1999 – Gratien Gélinas, Canadian actor, director, and playwright (b. 1909)
2000 – Thomas Ferebee, American colonel and pilot (b. 1918)
  2000   – Pavel Prudnikau, Belarusian poet and author (b. 1911)
  2000   – Michael Starr, Canadian judge and politician, 16th Canadian Minister of Labour (b. 1910)
  2000   – Carlos Velázquez, Puerto Rican pitcher (b. 1948)
2001 – Bob Wollek, French race car driver (b. 1943)
2003 – Rachel Corrie, American activist (b. 1979)
  2003   – Ronald Ferguson, English captain, polo player, and manager (b. 1931)
2004 – Vilém Tauský, Czech conductor and composer (b. 1910)
2005 – Todd Bell, American football player (b. 1958)
  2005   – Ralph Erskine, English architect, designed The London Ark (b. 1914)
  2005   – Dick Radatz, American baseball player (b. 1937)
2007 – Manjural Islam Rana, Bangladeshi cricketer (b. 1984)
2008 – Bill Brown, Australian cricketer and soldier (b. 1912)
  2008   – Ivan Dixon, American actor, director, and producer (b. 1931)
  2008   – Gary Hart, American wrestler and manager (b. 1942)
2010 – Ksenija Pajčin,  Serbian singer, dancer and model (b. 1977)
2011 – Richard Wirthlin, American religious leader (b. 1931)
2012 – Donald E. Hillman, American colonel and pilot (b. 1918)
  2012   – Takaaki Yoshimoto, Japanese poet, philosopher, and critic (b. 1924)
2013 – Jamal Nazrul Islam, Bangladeshi physicist and cosmologist (b. 1939)
  2013   – José Alfredo Martínez de Hoz, Argentinian economist and politician, Minister of Economy of Argentina (b. 1925)
  2013   – Yadier Pedroso, Cuban pitcher (b. 1986)
  2013   – Ruchoma Shain, American-born teacher and author (b. 1914)
  2013   – Marina Solodkin, Russian-Israeli academic and politician (b. 1952)
  2013   – Frank Thornton, English actor (b. 1921)
2014 – Gary Bettenhausen, American race car driver (b. 1941)
  2014   – Donald Crothers, American chemist and academic (b. 1937)
  2014   – Yulisa Pat Amadu Maddy, Sierra Leonean author, poet, and playwright (b. 1936)
  2014   – Steve Moore, English author and illustrator (b. 1949)
  2014   – Alexander Pochinok, Russian economist and politician (b. 1958)
2015 – Jack Haley, American basketball player and sportscaster (b. 1964)
  2015   – Don Robertson, American pianist and composer (b. 1922)
2016 – Alexander Esenin-Volpin, Russian-American mathematician and poet (b. 1924)
  2016   – Frank Sinatra Jr., American singer and actor (b. 1944)
2017 – Lewis Rowland, American neurologist (b. 1925)
2018 – Louise Slaughter, Member of the U.S. House of Representatives from New York (b. 1929)
2019 – Dick Dale, American surf-rock guitarist, singer, and songwriter (b. 1937)

Holidays and observances

Christian feast day:
Abbán
Finian Lobhar (Finian the Leper)
Heribert of Cologne
Hilarius of Aquileia
Julian of Antioch
March 16 (Eastern Orthodox liturgics)
Day of the Book Smugglers (Lithuania)
Remembrance day of the Latvian legionnaires (Latvia)
Saint Urho's Day (Finnish Americans and Finnish Canadians)

References

External links

 BBC: On This Day
 
 Historical Events on March 16

Days of the year
March